The 2014–15 Jacksonville Dolphins women's basketball team represented Jacksonville University in the 2014–15 NCAA Division I women's basketball season. The Dolphins were coached by second year head coach Yolett McPhee-McCuin and were a member of the Atlantic Sun Conference. They finished the season 12–17, 6-8 for a three-way tie for a fourth-place finish. They advance to the semifinals of the 2015 Atlantic Sun women's basketball tournament which they lost to Florida Gulf Coast.

Media
All home games and conference road will be shown on ESPN3 or A-Sun.TV. Road games will typically be available on the opponents website.

2014–15 Roster

Schedule

|-
!colspan=9 style="background:#215E21; color:#C5B358;"|Regular Season

|-
! colspan=9 style="background:#C5B358;"|2015 Atlantic Sun Tournament

See also
2014–15 Jacksonville Dolphins men's basketball team

References

Jacksonville
Jacksonville Dolphins women's basketball seasons